Vatnsfjörður is a nature reserve located north-west of Breiðafjörður on the Hjarðarnes coast of northwestern Iceland.

External links and sources
The Environment Agency of Iceland (Umhverfisstofnun): Vatnsfjörður

National parks of Iceland
Protected areas established in 1975
Westfjords